The Association for Educational Communications and Technology (AECT), is an academic and professional association that promotes educational uses of technology. Members provide leadership in the field by promoting scholarship and best practices in instructional technology and educational technology.  AECT's headquarters is in Bloomington, Indiana, having moved from Washington, DC in 1999.  

AECT publishes three journals: 
 TechTrends, a bimonthly for "leaders in technology and education"
 Educational Technology Research and Development, a bimonthly academic journal
 The Quarterly Review of Distance Education, a quarterly academic journal

AECT sponsors the International Student Media Festival (ISMF) and sponsors an annual academic conference.

See also
J. Michael Spector, past president of AECT
Christopher Dede

References

External links
Association for Educational Communications and Technology, official website

Educational technology academic and professional associations
Supraorganizations
Educational organizations based in the United States
Companies based in Bloomington, Indiana
Year of establishment missing